Torus is the second studio album by British DJ and record producer Sub Focus. The album was released on 30 September 2013, through RAM Records, Mercury Records and Virgin EMI Records.

Musical concept and songs
Torus is the geometric name for the shape in Sub Focus' logo. It was originally used on his debut album cover and the shape has played a big part in his live shows as well as in promotion and artwork. The title track was written as an intro to Douwma's live sets, in preparation for a Brixton performance in 2012. He wanted to start his sets with a low tempo and gradually speed up.

"Safe in Sound" was one of the earliest tracks to be completed and was written with Seton Daunt and later given the Mary O'Hara sample.

"Endorphins" originally had a female vocalist, and was given to several artists but in the end Alex Clare visited Nick's studio to record what would be the final version of the track.

"Twilight" was written as an ambient contrast to the club-orientated songs on the album, as Douwma viewed the album as a journey and wanted constant progression.

The synth hook on "Falling Down" was originally intended for the Chase & Status and Takura collaboration "Flashing Lights", but did not fit the song so was re-used as a starting point for the new song. While the track was being finished, Skrillex coincidentally visited the studios to meet Caspa and Douwma showed him the track. Skrillex enjoyed it and decided to release it alongside remixes on Owsla.

"Turn Back Time" was one of the last songs to be finished on the album. At the time, he was experimenting with 90's rave samples, and the song originally used a sample but was re-recorded.

"You Make It Better" was also one of the final songs to be finished on the album. At the time, it was just a loop, and Culture Shock had a lot of ideas to develop it. They wanted a hook for the breakdown of the song, so TC recorded vocals for it.

The vocals on "Tidal Wave" were originally on another Sub Focus demo but instead got used on the "Tidal Wave" instrumental.

"Until the End" was inspired by the Drive soundtrack and was written as a concluding track for the album.

Track listing

Notes
 "Safe in Sound" features uncredited vocals from Julian Bunetta.
 "Twilight" features uncredited vocals from Teemu Brunila.
 "Turn Back Time" features uncredited vocals from Yolanda Quartey.

Sample credits
 "Torus" contains samples of Charles I. Halt's recording of the 1980 Rendlesham Forest incident.
 "Safe in Sound" contains samples of the Irish folk song "Óró Mo Bháidín", performed by Mary O'Hara.
 "Turn Back Time" contains elements of the song "Brass Disk", performed by Duprée and written by Todd Terry, and lyrics from the song "Missing You", written by Kim English and Frankie Feliciano.

Personnel
Nick "Sub Focus" Douwma – producer, mixing , remix and additional production 

Additional musicians
Alex Clare – vocals 
Alice McLaughlin – vocals 
Amanda Ghost – writer 
Bryn Christopher – writer 
Catherine Pockson – vocals 
Frankie Feliciano – co-producer (sampled) 
Fred Vahrman and Joshua Jackson – remix and additional production 
Ian Dench – writer 
James "Culture Shock" Pountney – co-producer 
Jenna "JayEllDee" Dickens – vocals 
Jonnali Parmenius – writer 
Julian Bunetta – vocals 
Kele Okereke – vocals 
Kenzie May – vocals 
Kim English – vocals (sampled) 
Louisa "Foxes" Allen – vocals 
Mans Wrendenberg – writer 
Mary O'Hara – vocals (sampled) 
Robert Matthews – co-producer 
Seton Daunt – guitars 
Takura Tendayi – writer 
Tom "TC" Casswell – vocals 
Teemu Brunila – vocals 
Thomas "Tom Cane" Havelock – writer 
Todd Terry – co-producer (sampled) 
Uzoechi "MNEK" Emenike – vocals 
Yolanda Quartey – vocals

Charts

Release history

References

2013 albums
Sub Focus albums
RAM Records albums